La Segunda Central Bakery is a historic purveyor of Cuban bread, pastries, and other baked goods in the Ybor City section of Tampa, Florida. Founded in 1915, it was one of three bakeries begun in a co-op: La Primera, La Segunda and La Tercera. The other two closed and La Segunda was purchased by Juan Moré, whose family has continued its operation for four generations.

La Segunda Central is the largest baker of Cuban bread in Tampa and delivers its signature product to many stores and restaurants around town, including the historic Columbia Restaurant nearby in Ybor City. 
The business operates as a wholesale and retail bakery as well as a deli, offering a wide assortment of specialties including medianoche bread, scacciata, meat pies, sausage rolls, guava turnovers, Spanish cuisine flan, Italian cookie, sandwiches, cakes and café con leche. The bakery is located at 2512 N 15th Street.

References

External links
La Segunda Central Bakery website

Bakeries of the United States
Catalan American
Cuban-American culture in Tampa, Florida
Companies based in Tampa, Florida
Restaurants in Tampa, Florida
Spanish-American culture in Tampa, Florida
1915 establishments in Florida
Restaurants established in 1915